Shawnee Land is a residential community in Frederick County, Virginia, United States. Shawnee Land is located on the eastern slopes of Great North Mountain. The U.S. Census Bureau defines it as a census-designated place (listed as Shawneeland), with a population of 1,873 as of 2010. In its past, Shawnee Land was a ski resort, with a number of slopes located on the eastern side of Great North Mountain. Shawnee Land thrived for a few years, but eventually the investors abandoned the project and the ski slopes were closed.

Geography
The community drains east to the valley of Hogue Creek, which flows northeast to join Back Creek, a tributary of the Potomac River.

References

Census-designated places in Frederick County, Virginia
Census-designated places in Virginia